The Postbank Challenge was a golf tournament on the Challenge Tour that was played in 2007 at Golfclub Mülheim an der Ruhr near Mülheim, Germany. It was hosted by European Tour player Marcel Siem.

Winners

External links
Official coverage on the Challenge Tour's official site

Former Challenge Tour events
Golf tournaments in Germany